Megalithic Symphony is the debut studio album by American rock band Awolnation, released on March 15, 2011 through Red Bull Records. The album is the band's first full-length release, following the release of the extended play Back From Earth (2010). Megalithic Symphony has since peaked at number 84 on the United States Billboard 200 and at number 57 on the Austrian Albums Chart. As of March 2015, the album sold 581,000 copies in the United States.

On February 29, 2016, the RIAA certified Megalithic Symphony platinum.

In 2021, for the album's 10th anniversary, a special edition of it was released, including unreleased songs and live performances of some older songs, for a total of 27 bonus tracks.

Track listing

Lyrical content

Some Sort of Creature
In a live Facebook Q&A session, Aaron described “Some Sort of Creature” as something he truly experienced. “What you hear on that track, a sort of segue track, is really what actually happened! And that's really all I can describe; it's me speaking to myself, because I didn’t want to forget this thing I saw. And it's all right there in the song."

Personnel

Awolnation
 Aaron Bruno – vocals and synthesizer (all tracks except 2 and 9), drums (tracks 1, 4-12, 14), percussion (tracks 1, 3, 4, 11), keyboards (tracks 1, 12, 14), bass  guitar (tracks 1, 5, 10), guitar (tracks 5, 7, 14), piano (tracks 10, 13), Fender Rhodes electric piano (track 7), synth bass (tracks 11, 12, 14); additional bass guitar and drums (track 3); string arrangement (track 10)
 Drew Stewart – guitar (tracks 3, 11)
 Christopher Thorn – guitar (tracks 5, 10, 11)
 Kenny Carkeet – synthesizer (track 5)
 Hayden Scott – drums (track 5)
 David Amezcua – bass guitar (track 14)

Additional musicians
 Jimmy Messer – guitar (tracks 3, 4, 6-8, 11-14), drums (tracks 6, 7, 13), synthesizer (tracks 6, 7), bass guitar (track 6), synth bass (track 7), keyboards (track 13)
 Billy Mohler – bass guitar (tracks 3, 4, 7, 8, 10-13)
 Tony Royster Jr. – drums (track 3)
 Brian West – Casio keyboards and synthesizer (track 8)
 Watts Choir – vocals (tracks 4, 9, 13)
 Arielle Verinis – vocals (track 11)
 Cameron Duddy, Curtain$ and Tarrah Toland – vocals (track 14)
 Eric Stenman - Engineer, Mixer, Additional Production; whistling (track 10)

Charts

Weekly charts

Year-end charts

Certifications

}

Release history

References

2011 debut albums
Awolnation albums
Red Bull Records albums